Coplow Dale (or Coplowdale) is a small settlement in the civil parish of Little Hucklow, Derbyshire, England.

External links
Coplow Dale at Streetmap.co.uk

Hamlets in Derbyshire
Derbyshire Dales